Curridabat is a district of the Curridabat canton, in the San José province of Costa Rica.

Geography 
Curridabat has an area of  km2 and an elevation of  metres.

It is situated on the eastern border of the San José capital city, north of Desamparados Canton, and south of Montes de Oca Canton.

Demographics 

For the 2011 census, Curridabat had a population of  inhabitants.

Transportation

Road transportation 
The district is covered by the following road routes:
 National Route 2
 National Route 210
 National Route 211
 National Route 215
 National Route 221
 National Route 251
 National Route 252

Rail transportation 
The Interurbano Line operated by Incofer goes through this district.

References

External links
 General information about Curridabat, including maps 
 Government site 

Districts of San José Province
Populated places in San José Province